Deh-e Piran may refer to:
 Deh-e Piran, Khuzestan
 Deh-e Piran, Sistan and Baluchestan

See also
 Piran (disambiguation)